Prakash Gajbhiye is a Member of Maharashtra Legislative Council who belongs to the Nationalist Congress Party (NCP). He was the leader of opposition in Nagpur Municipal Corporation and Senate member in the Nagpur University.

References

Living people
Members of the Maharashtra Legislative Council
Nationalist Congress Party politicians from Maharashtra
Year of birth missing (living people)